Iredell is a city located in Bosque County in central Texas, United States. The population was 339 at the 2010 census.

Geography

Iredell is located at  (31.984589, –97.870727).

Demographics

As of the census of 2000, there were 360 people, 146 households, and 104 families residing in the city. The population density was 783.8 people per square mile (302.2/km2). There were 162 housing units at an average density of 352.7 per square mile (136.0/km2). The racial makeup of the city was 96.94% White, 2.50% from other races, and 0.56% from two or more races. Hispanic or Latino of any race were 5.56% of the population.

There were 146 households, out of which 33.6% had children under the age of 18 living with them, 60.3% were married couples living together, 9.6% had a female householder with no husband present, and 28.1% were non-families. 27.4% of all households were made up of individuals, and 15.1% had someone living alone who was 65 years of age or older. The average household size was 2.47 and the average family size was 2.98.

In the city, the population was spread out, with 28.3% under the age of 18, 6.4% from 18 to 24, 26.1% from 25 to 44, 21.1% from 45 to 64, and 18.1% who were 65 years of age or older. The median age was 38 years. For every 100 females, there were 96.7 males. For every 100 females age 18 and over, there were 94.0 males.

The median income for a household in the city was $22,083, and the median income for a family was $27,917. Males had a median income of $34,583 versus $25,577 for females. The per capita income for the city was $12,152. About 20.4% of families and 24.5% of the population were below the poverty line, including 40.2% of those under age 18 and 21.2% of those age 65 or over.

Education
Iredell is served by the Iredell Independent School District.

Notable people

 Clara McDonald Williamson, a Naïve painter that was born in Iredell, and lived there for much of her early life
 Foy Willing was born in Iredell. He was a singer, songwriter, musician

References

Cities in Bosque County, Texas
Cities in Texas